Günther Glassauer (born 31 March 1948) is a German athlete. He competed in the men's javelin throw at the 1972 Summer Olympics.

References

External links
 

1948 births
Living people
Athletes (track and field) at the 1972 Summer Olympics
German male javelin throwers
Olympic athletes of West Germany
People from Wetzlar
Sportspeople from Giessen (region)